Lawlessness is a lack of law, in any of the various senses of that word. Lawlessness may describe various conditions.

In society
Anomie is a breakdown of social bonds between an individual and their community, in which individuals do not feel bound by the moral strictures of society. The term was popularized by French sociologist Émile Durkheim in his influential 1897 book Suicide.

Anarchy (meaning "without leadership") is a condition in which a person or group of people reject societal hierarchies, laws, and other institutions. It often entails the dissolution of government.

Anarchism is a political philosophy that advocates self-governed societies based on voluntary institutions.

Civil disorder, or civil unrest, refers to public disturbances generally involving groups of people, and resulting in danger or damage to persons or property. Civil disorder is a breakdown of civil society, and may be a form of protest. It may take various forms, such as illegal parades, sit-ins, riots, sabotage, and other forms of crime.

In nature
Randomness is the lack of pattern or predictability in events.

In religion
Antinomianism, in Christianity, is a theological position which takes the principle of salvation by faith and divine grace to the point of asserting that the saved are not bound to follow the Law of Moses.

See also
Law (disambiguation)

References

Broad-concept articles
Legal terminology
Anarchism
Injustice